The Fiat 2000 was an Italian heavy tank designed and produced by Fiat during  World War I. Only two were built as it never entered serial production. It was one of the largest designs of its time.

History
During World War I, Italy did not field any armoured units, due to a lack of tanks. The only solution at the time was to begin production of original designs.

The order to design and produce the first Italian tanks was accepted by the FIAT automobile company in 1916. The prototype of the new tank was displayed to a military commission on 21 June 1917; its mechanical systems were complete but its superstructure was added later, being represented on the prototype by a wooden mockup with a conical open turret and dummy gun. The final configuration of the superstructure was not completed until 1918.

Description
The FIAT 2000 was a substantial vehicle, of comparable dimensions to the British Mark V tanks, and weighing 40 tons as compared to the Mark V's 28 tons.

The driver was seated at the front, with very good overall vision consisting of a large port forward and small lateral loopholes.

The layout of the FIAT 2000 differed to the other tanks then in use, especially the British ones. The engine was separated from the crew; not placed behind the crew compartment as modern tanks, but below it. The mechanical layout was also interesting and innovative, comprising a FIAT Aviazione A12, water-cooled  engine with 6 cylinders driving the tracks through a transverse transmission. The fuel capacity was 600 - 1,000 liters, but this gave only 75 km range on paved roads.

The tracks were longer than the hull, but were lower in comparison to the wrap-around type found on the British 'rhomboidal' tanks and thus lower in weight.

The armour was of clean design, being made of riveted steel plates. It was 15 mm thick on the sides and 20 mm on the front.

Armament originally consisted of the turret mounted gun and ten machineguns (three on each side and four in front), but this left the rear of the tank undefended and tended to contaminate the interior with propellant fumes, so it was decided to install a ventilator in the roof and alter the machinegun positions to two on each side, three at the rear, and two in front.

Perhaps the most interesting feature of the tank's weaponry was the turret; apart from the Renault FT, this was the first tank to have a rotating turret mounted above the hull. The turret was made of four pieces rivetted together and had room enough for two crew members. Its weapon was a 65/17 howitzer (of 65mm caliber with a barrel 17 calibers long). Thanks to the tall turret and the space available beneath it, the gun's elevation was -10/+75°.

Service
This tank was often called 'the heaviest World War I tank' but this is not strictly accurate, since the FIAT 2000 never actually saw combat in World War I. Also, the modest order for 50 tanks was never completed, the only tanks produced being two prototypes. But at difference of the K-Wagen, was built and so is the heaviest tank of World War I.

After the war the FIAT 2000 was displayed as one of the weapons used 'to defeat the enemy' and the two prototypes completed were sent to Libya to fight guerrilla forces, together with other tanks bought from France, in a special unit, the Tank battery (1° Batteria autonoma carri d'assalto).

In Libya, the FIAT tank proved capable of an average speed of 4 km/h, and so, after two months its career ended, being unable to keep up with rapid movement of the enemy. One remained in Tripoli and the other was sent to Italy in the spring of 1919, where it performed before the King at Rome Stadium. The tank put on a convincing display: it climbed a 1.1 m wall, then faced another 3.5 m wall, which it knocked down with its weight. Then a trench of 3 m width was successfully crossed and several trees were knocked down. This impressive performance failed to revive interest in the heavy tank and so it was abandoned.

The surviving FIAT 2000 at Rome was left in a depot for several years, until it was sent on the orders of Colonel Maltese to Forte Tiburtino, risking to catch fire during the travel. In 1934 it was seen again in a Campo Dux parade, having been repainted and even rearmed, with two 37/40 mm guns instead of the forward machine guns. It was later reportedly transformed into a monument at Bologna, after that its fate is unknown, like the other tank.

Replica
A project aimed at building a full-sized working replica of the Fiat 2000 has been created as of March 2017. The project was started by volunteers, aiming to raise the necessary funds with crowdfunding. From June 2017 to October 2018 the committee worked on remaking a complete set of blueprints, after which the construction of the replica started on 15 November 2018. The project was declared complete and was painted and running on its own power as of April 2020

Sources
 Pignato, Nicola, Storia dei mezzi corazzati, Fratelli Fabbri editori, 1976, pag. 81-88.

See also

 Fiat 3000

References

External links
 The Advanced Fiat 2000 Heavy Tank(Dead link)
 History of the Italian Tank Corps
 Photogallery

World War I tanks of Italy
Heavy tanks
2000